Bythocrotus cephalotes is a species of spider in the family Salticidae, found in Hispaniola.

References

Salticidae
Spiders of the Caribbean
Spiders described in 1888